Many of the tallest buildings in Toronto are also the tallest in all of Canada. The tallest structure in Toronto is the CN Tower, which rises . The CN Tower was the tallest free-standing structure on land from 1975 until 2007. However, it is not generally considered a high-rise building as it does not have successive floors that can be occupied. The tallest habitable building in the city is First Canadian Place, which rises 298 metres (978 ft) tall in Toronto's Financial District and was completed in 1975. It also stands as the tallest building in Canada.

The history of skyscrapers in Toronto began in 1894 with the construction of the Beard Building, which is often regarded as the first skyscraper in the city. Toronto went through its first building boom in the late 1920s and early 1930s, during which the number of high-rise buildings in the city vastly increased.

The city then experienced a second, much larger building boom, which was at its peak between 1967 and 1976. This period saw the construction of Canada's three tallest buildings and six of its top ten (at the time). When topped off in 1967, the TD Bank Tower was the 14th tallest building in the world. The TD Tower would soon be followed by Commerce Court West, the 14th tallest building in the world at the time of its completion in 1972. Later, Canada's current tallest building, the First Canadian Place, became the eighth tallest building in the world at the time of its completion in 1975. After the mid-1970s, the pace of the boom slowed considerably but continued onto the early 1990s, culminating with the construction of the city's and Canada's second and third tallest buildings: Scotia Plaza and the TD Canada Trust Tower.

After this boom, the city went through a third, shorter lull in construction from 1993 to 2004, in which the city added only one new building to its top 20. Of the 21 buildings in Toronto taller than 200 metres, only seven were built prior to 2010. In 2012, The St. Regis Toronto (then known as Trump International Hotel and Tower) was completed, with a top dome height of 252 m (827 ft) and an antenna height of 277 metres (908 ft), making it the fourth-tallest structure in Toronto and all of Canada. With the completion in late 2014 of Aura—which, at 78 storeys and a height of 272 m (892 ft), is the tallest residential building in Canada—the tallest building under construction is the 309-metre (1,014 ft) tall The One (though the developer applied for a height increase to ), also a residential building.

Natalie Alcoba of the National Post described this phenomenon as the "Manhattanization" of Toronto in reference to the built-up nature of the namesake island borough in New York City. In one week of 2018, Toronto City Council approved 755 storeys of new development in the city's downtown core. The Toronto skyline (especially the CN Tower) can be spotted by the naked eye during clear daylight skies from locations as far as Newmarket from the north, Clarington from the east, several points along the Niagara Escarpment from the west, and Fort Niagara State Park in the south across Lake Ontario in the U.S. state of New York.

As of January 2023, Toronto has constructed 81 skyscrapers and has a further 36 under construction. Toronto also has 92 skyscrapers that are either approved or in the proposal stage. Toronto currently ranks 20th in the world with most skyscrapers already completed, third in North America and first in Canada. Toronto ranks fourth in the world and first in North America with the number of skyscrapers under construction.


Ranking by standard height
There are 80 skyscrapers in Toronto that stand at least  ranked by standard height measurement as of October 2021. This includes spires and architectural details, but does not include antenna masts. An equal sign (=) following a rank indicates the same height between two or more buildings. An asterisk (*) indicates that a building has been topped out, but not completed. The "Year" column indicates the year in which a building was completed. Freestanding observation and/or telecommunication towers, while not habitable buildings, are included for comparison purposes; however, they are not ranked. One such tower is the CN Tower.

Ranking by pinnacle height
Skyscrapers and other structures may also be measured based on their pinnacle height, which includes radio masts and antennas. As architectural features and spires can be regarded as subjective, some skyscraper enthusiasts prefer this method of measurement. Standard architectural height measurement, which excludes antennas in building height, is included for comparative purposes.

Under construction
There are 36 buildings under construction in Toronto that are planned to rise at least  as of January 2023.

Timeline of tallest buildings

See also

 List of tallest buildings in Canada
 List of tallest buildings in Ottawa–Gatineau
 List of tallest buildings in Hamilton, Ontario
List of tallest buildings in Mississauga
List of tallest buildings in Niagara Falls, Ontario
List of tallest buildings in London, Ontario
List of tallest buildings in Windsor, Ontario
 Architecture of Toronto
 Eaton's / John Maryon Tower in Downtown Toronto, which was proposed to be the world's tallest building at the time, later replaced with College Park
 Manhattanization
 UrbanToronto (a blog and online forum for discussion of buildings in Toronto and other Toronto-related topics)

References

External links

 Emporis database with Toronto buildings
 Emporis.com – Toronto
 SkyscraperPage.com – Toronto
 SkyscraperPage.com diagram of Toronto skyscrapers

Toronto

Buildings, tallest
Tallest buildings in Toronto